The Class of 1959 Chapel is a non-denominational chapel located on the campus of Harvard Business School in Boston, Massachusetts.  It was designed by Moshe Safdie in 1992, as part of a master plan to complement the existing 1927 campus architecture by McKim, Mead and White that would allow for Business School to expand along the Charles River.  It was funded by a gift from alumni from the Class of 1959.  It was engineered by Weidlinger Associates and built by Richard White Sons, Inc. for a cost of approximately $2.5 million.

Structure
The chapel consists of an  concrete cylinder surfaced with a layer of patinaed bronze. On one side of the cylinder is a pyramidal glass greenhouse that houses a below-ground koi pond decorated with live plants, a small waterfall, and concrete blocks that serve as stepping stones.

Outside the chapel is a rectangular marble tower containing a two-story steel pole and a large bronze ball.  The tower is a functioning clock; as the ball moves up and down the pole, lines on the tower indicate the time of day.  The timepiece was designed by Karl Schlamminger.

Interior
The chapel itself occupies nearly all of the ground floor of the building and is accessed through a tall metal door from the greenhouse.  The interior is a two-story stone cylinder with several semi-circular concrete constructions scalloping the walls.  At the top of the cylinder are thin windows with several long prisms designed by the artist Charles Ross that create raking light and occasionally rainbows across the austere concrete interior.

Usage
The furnishings are simple and consist primarily of rows of wooden chairs, which seat approximately 100 people, a spare concrete altar, a piano, and a harpsichord.  The acoustics of the chapel are very crisp for a room made almost entirely of concrete.  The chapel is used by the Harvard Business School community for non-denominational services, private celebrations, and concerts.

Gallery

References

External links

Safdie Architects profile
Richard White Sons profile

Churches completed in 1992
Harvard Business School
Harvard University buildings
University and college chapels in the United States
Churches in Boston
Moshe Safdie buildings
1992 establishments in Massachusetts